This is a list of video games that multiple reputable video game journalists or magazines have considered to be among the best of all time. The games listed here are included on at least six separate "best/greatest of all time" lists from different publications, as chosen by their editorial staffs.

List

Publications
The reference numbers in the notes section show which of the 49 selected publications list the game.

 1001 Video Games You Must Play Before You Die – 2013
 The Age – 2005
 Collider – 2020
 Digitally Downloaded – 2016
 Electric Playground Network – 2013
 Edge – 2000, 2015, 2017
 Electronic Fun with Computers & Games - 1984
 Empire – 2009
 Entertainment Weekly – 2003
 Esquire – 2018, 2020
 FHM – 2010
 Flux – 1995
 G4 – 2012
 GamesMaster - 1994, 1996
 Gamecenter - 2000
 Game Informer – 2009, 2018
 Game On! From Pong to Oblivion – 2006
 GameSpot – 2000, 2007
 GameSpy – 2001
 Gamereactor – 2011, 2017
 GamesRadar+ – 2011, 2012, 2013, 2014, 2015, 2021
 GamesTM – 2010, 2018
 Gameswelt – 2012, 2016
 GamingBolt – 2013, 2022
 GQ – 2013
 The Greatest Games – 1985
 Hardcore Gaming 101 – 2015, 2020
 Hyper – 1995, 1997, 1999
 IGN – 2003, 2005, 2007, 2015, 2018, 2019, 2021
 The Independent – 1999
 The Irish Times – 2013
 Jeuxvideo.com – 2011, 2017
 Mashable – 2020
 Next Generation – 1996, 1999
 Parade - 2023
 Polygon – 2017
 Popular Mechanics – 2014, 2019
 Power Unlimited – 2015
 PPE – 2021
 Slant Magazine – 2014, 2018, 2020
 Stuff – 2008, 2014, 2017
 Super GamePower - 2001
 Sydney Morning Herald – 2002
 The Times - 2023
 Time – 2012, 2016
 Total Games Network - 1999
 USA Today / Sports Illustrated - 2022, 2023
 TheWrap – 2017
 Yahoo! – 2005

See also
 List of best-selling video games
 List of Game of the Year awards
 List of video games notable for negative reception

Notes
The reference numbers show which publications include the game.

References

External links
 Highest rated games on Metacritic and OpenCritic

Best game list
Video Games
Video games